Ronald Charles Grant, 10th Baron de Longueuil was born on 13 March 1888 at Pau, France. He was the son of John Moore Charles de Bienville Grant. He married Ernestine Hester Maud Bowes-Lyon, daughter of the Hon. Ernest Bowes-Lyon and Isobel Hester Drummond, on 4 October 1918.  He was educated at Elizabeth College, Guernsey. He was in the French Foreign Legion and was a civil engineer.  

He succeeded to the title of Baron de Longueuil on 17 October 1935.  He fought in the Second World War as an officer in the service of the 3rd Battalion, King's Own Yorkshire Light Infantry.

Ancestry

References

recognized by the Crown in right of Canada

People from Pau, Pyrénées-Atlantiques
1888 births
Year of death missing
Barons of Longueuil
Le Moyne family